Cyprus participated in the Eurovision Song Contest 2022 in Turin, Italy, having internally selected Andromache to represent the country with the song "", which was written by Alex Papaconstantinou, Arash, Eyelar Mirzazadeh, Fatjon Miftaraj, Filloreta "Fifi" Raçi, Geraldo Sandell, Giorgos Papadopoulos, Robert Uhlmann, Viktor Svensson and Yll Limani.

Cyprus was drawn to compete in the second semi-final of the Eurovision Song Contest which took place on 12 May 2022. Performing during the show in position 9, "" was not announced among the top 10 entries of the second semi-final and therefore did not qualify to compete in the final. It was later revealed that Cyprus placed 12th out of the 18 participating countries in the semi-final with 63 points.

Background 

Its best placing was at the  where Eleni Foureira placed second with "". Cyprus' least successful result was in the  when it placed last with the song "" by Elpida, receiving only four points in total. After returning to the contest in  following their one-year absence from the  due to the 2012–13 Cypriot financial crisis and the broadcaster's budget restrictions, Cyprus has qualified for the final of all the contests in which it has participated.

The Cypriot national broadcaster, CyBC, broadcasts the contest within Cyprus and organises the selection process for the nation's entry. Cyprus has used various methods to select its entry in the past, such as internal selections and televised national finals to choose the performer, song or both to compete at Eurovision. In 2015, the broadcaster organised the national final Eurovision Song Project, which featured 54 songs competing in a nine-week-long process resulting in the selection of the Cypriot entry through the combination of public televoting and the votes from an expert jury. Since 2016, however, the broadcaster has opted to select the entry internally without input from the public.

Before Eurovision

Internal selection 
In September 2021, CEO of Panik Records George Arsenakos claimed that the label had signed an agreement with CyBC to establish a national final in order to select the Cypriot entrant for 2023. In January 2022, it was announced an agreement between the two parties is already in place for the 2022 selection and that the performance of the chosen act will be staged by Marvin Dietmann and Dan Shipton, both having previous experience at Eurovision.

Greek singer Andromachi Dimitropoulou, former contestant of The Voice of Greece, was rumoured to be the selected representative for Cyprus. The Cypriot radio programme Good Morning Show reported that the name of their national representative ended with -machi, and in addition to this, Dimitropoulou is signed with Panik Records.
Dimitropoulou was officially announced as the Cypriot entrant with the song "" on 9 March 2022 during the RIK 1 programme , where the music video, shot on 5 March in Athens, was also premiered.

At Eurovision 
According to Eurovision rules, all nations with the exceptions of the host country and the "Big Five" (France, Germany, Italy, Spain and the United Kingdom) are required to qualify from one of two semi-finals in order to compete for the final; the top ten countries from each semi-final progress to the final. The European Broadcasting Union (EBU) split up the competing countries into six different pots based on voting patterns from previous contests, with countries with favourable voting histories put into the same pot. On 25 January 2022, an allocation draw was held which placed each country into one of the two semi-finals, as well as which half of the show they would perform in. Cyprus has been placed into the second semi-final, to be held on 12 May 2022, and has been scheduled to perform in the first half of the show.

Once all the competing songs for the 2022 contest had been released, the running order for the semi-finals was decided by the shows' producers rather than through another draw, so that similar songs were not placed next to each other. They were not announced as one of the ten qualifiers, marking the first time Cyprus has failed to qualify since 2013. It was later announced that Cyprus placed twelfth in the semi-final with 63 points.

Voting

Points awarded to Cyprus

Points awarded by Cyprus

Detailed voting results

References 

2022
Countries in the Eurovision Song Contest 2022
Eurovision